Tarek Yehia (born 10 September 1961) is an Egyptian former football player and Zamalek former international left winger. He worked as caretaker at Zamalek for many terms.

Playing career

Early career
He was born in Kafr el-Sheikh. He started his career as a footballer when he was 19. Luck played a big role as Zamalek went to Kafr el-Sheikh to play a friendly match with Zamalek-kelen. Fortunately, he played this match and scored 2 goals in Zamalek. The coach at this time was Mr. Micheal Everts, who was very amused by the young player's performance. Eventually, the transition was made by Zamalek under supervision of captain Ahmad Mustafa and the 19-year-old player signed for Zamalek.

He did not have any idea, that he was going to be one of the greatest players in the club's history. At first, he started by playing for the U-21 team at Zamalek and made a stunning performance, which eventually led him to the first team. The match which introduced the left wing as a fan idol was against Esco, as Zamalek won by half a dozen goals; his share from it was a hat-trick. He then reserved a place in Zamalek's starting 11 instead of a reserve, which was the first step on the way of glory with his club.

Zamalek
In his career he brought to Zamalek 6 titles: 2 Egyptian Premier League, 1 Egypt Cup, 2 African Champions League, and 1 Afro-Asian Cup. Specialized in African Club cups, he scored 10 Goals for Zamalek in African matches only. Also, he scored one of the greatest goals in Egyptian football history against Al Ahly as he passed two Central backs as well as the goalkeeper and tore the nets of the red devils with one of the best goals ever recorded in Egyptian football. He set the record as the 2nd best scorer in Zamalek history with 99 goals after Gamal Abdelhamid. Yehia scored 78 goal in the Egyptian league (3 of them in Al Ahli club) and 11 goals in Egyptian Cup and 10 goals in African contests.

National team
His History with the Egyptian football team is also great, as he contributed with his efforts in winning the bronze medal in the Mediterranean sea Championship 1983 and also the 1986 African Cup of Nations. He played in the 1988 and 1990 African Cup of Nations. He played for Egypt in the 1986 FIFA World Cup qualifying rounds.

Coaching career

Early career
The young coach started as an assistant coach under Essam Baheeg for Suez canal club Al-kanah in 1994 which won the FA cup which replaced in this year the Egyptian cup title.
then he moved with Baheeg to Dina Farms in 1996 as the team scored his best ever ranking in Egyptian Premier League (5th position)
In addition, he trained Zamalek in 2002-2003 season under the Brazilian Carlos Roberto Cabral and won 1 African champions league title and 1 Egyptian super cup before resigning from the team as he wanted to start his sole coaching career.

Tanta
He became the coach of Tanta in the Egyptian Second Division, which he was about to promote it to the Premier League but he failed. The team played a decisive game with Koroum and lost 1-0.

Itesalat
He then accepted an offer from Itesalat (aka Telecom Egypt), which was a challenge for him as the goal of the newly founded team (1974) and the chairman was to promote the team to the Egyptian Premier League. He achieved the goal by promoting them in addition to setting many records which included best defence, attack and best scorer in Second Division.

Then, Yehia became the Assistant Coach for Zamalek once more. He accepted the challenge after the resignation of Mohammed Helmy, and he started his job under the lead of the German coach Reiner Hollmann.

El-Entag El-Harby
In preparation for its premier league campaign, El-Entag El-Harby (aka Military Production) appointed Tarek Yehia as the new manager. The team had recently won promotion to the Egyptian Premier League in the 2008–09 Egyptian Second Division for its first time with the previous coaching staff. Yehia quickly looked for the option of signing experienced Egyptian players that could lead the team to prevent relegation. He signed players such as Mohamed Aboul Ela (Zamalek former captain), Mostafa Kamal (Veteran Goal Keeper), Hassan Mousa, and others.

Tarek Yehia enjoyed great success with his team. He managed to lead the team to 4th place by the end of the first round of 2009–10 Egyptian Premier League. However, El-Entag El-Harby's form slightly fell to finish 7th by the end of the season.

Despite the great success with El-Entag El-Harby, Yehia's era at the club lasted for only that season. He preferred to move to newly promoted Misr El-Maqasha. Osama Orabi replaced him at El-Entag El-Harby.

Managerial statistics

Honours

As a player
 National team 
1 African Cup of Nations Title 1986
Bronze medal in Mediterranean Games 1983

 Zamalek 
4 Egyptian League Titles for Zamalek
1 Egyptian Cup Title for Zamalek
2 African Champions League Titles for Zamalek
1 Afro-Asian Cup Title for Zamalek

As a manager
 Zamalek 
1 African Champions' League title
1 Egyptian Super Cup Title for Zamalek

References

External links
 

1961 births
Living people
Egyptian footballers
Egypt international footballers
Mediterranean Games bronze medalists for Egypt
Competitors at the 1983 Mediterranean Games
1986 African Cup of Nations players
1988 African Cup of Nations players
1990 African Cup of Nations players
Zamalek SC players
Egyptian football managers
Ismaily SC managers
Zamalek SC managers
Petrojet SC managers
Egyptian Premier League players
People from Kafr El Sheikh Governorate
Africa Cup of Nations-winning players
Association football wingers
Mediterranean Games medalists in football